The 1984 German motorcycle Grand Prix was the fifth round of the 1984 Grand Prix motorcycle racing season. It took place on the weekend of 24–27 May 1984 at the Nürburgring.

Classification

500 cc

References

German motorcycle Grand Prix
German
German Motorcycle
Sport in Rhineland-Palatinate